Brooks Litchfield Conrad (born January 16, 1980) is an American former professional baseball second baseman and third baseman. He played in Major League Baseball (MLB) for the Oakland Athletics, Atlanta Braves, Milwaukee Brewers, and Tampa Bay Rays from 2008 to 2012 and the San Diego Padres in 2014. Conrad has also played in Nippon Professional Baseball for the Hanshin Tigers in 2013. Conrad has coached in the minor leagues for the Kansas City Royals organization following the conclusion of his playing career.

Playing career

Amateur career
Conrad is a graduate of Monte Vista High School in California. He was a member of the Arizona State Sun Devils baseball team from 1999 to 2001.

Houston Astros
Conrad was drafted by the Houston Astros in the eighth round (236th pick) of the 2001 Draft. He played with the Astros AAA team the Round Rock Express.

Oakland Athletics
Conrad signed with the Oakland Athletics organization prior to the 2008 season. He was called up to play with the A's against the Tampa Bay Rays on July 21, 2008. On August 12, Conrad was designated for assignment.

Atlanta Braves
Conrad became a free agent at the end of the season and signed a minor league contract with an invitation to spring training with the Atlanta Braves in November 2008.

On July 3, 2009, Conrad hit his first major league home run - a 3-run shot as a pinch-hitter in the Braves 9–8 win over the Washington Nationals after being called up from AAA Gwinnett. On July 7, 2009, Conrad hit his first career Major League triple off Chicago Cubs pitcher Carlos Zambrano. On September 1, 2009, Conrad was called back up to the Atlanta Braves.

In 2010, Conrad frequently picked up clutch hits at the end of games, but committed defensive miscues at the end of the season and postseason. On May 20, 2010, Conrad came to the plate with one out, the bases loaded in the bottom of the 9th, with the Braves trailing 9–6.  He hit a walk-off grand slam against Cincinnati Reds pitcher, Francisco Cordero, to cap an eight-run comeback for his team. On June 12, 2010, he dropped down an eventual game winning suicide squeeze bunt to score Gregor Blanco in the 9th inning against the Minnesota Twins. On July 24, 2010, Conrad hit his second go-ahead grand slam of the year, in the 8th inning against Burke Badenhop of the Florida Marlins.  The Braves went on to win, 10–5. On August 10, 2010, with a runner on first and no outs in the top of the 9th, Conrad hit a two-run homer to put the Braves ahead of the Houston Astros, 3–2, in a game that the Braves would go on to win. Nicholas James Baker  caught the home run ball over the rail of the second deck in his hat. On August 13, 2010, Conrad hit his final game-winning home run of the season.  This one came in the bottom of the 7th, against Hiroki Kuroda of the Los Angeles Dodgers.

In game three of the 2010 NLDS, Conrad made three errors in a loss to the San Francisco Giants, who would eventually go on to win the World Series.  His second error, in the second inning, let in a Giants' run.  His third error was far more important.  After Eric Hinske hit a two-run, eighth inning pinch-hit home run to put the Braves ahead by one run, Conrad let a ball go between his legs in the top of the ninth.  This error allowed the game-winning run to score. The Giants took a 2–1 series-lead. Conrad's three errors tied a Division Series record.

Conrad was replaced by veteran third baseman Troy Glaus in game four, but did not appear as a pinch-hitter in the game, a series-clinching win for the Giants. The infielder committed eight errors in his final seven games of the year. The Giants went on to win the World Series.

On May 1, 2011, in a game against the St. Louis Cardinals, Conrad came off the bench to hit a game-winning single in the bottom of the 9th inning to give the Braves a 6–5 victory. Later in the month on May 25 in a game against the Pittsburgh Pirates, Conrad launched a go-ahead and ultimately game-winning 2-run homer in the 11th inning.

Milwaukee Brewers 
On January 7, 2012, Conrad signed a minor league deal with the Milwaukee Brewers. His deal included an invitation to Spring Training. Conrad competed for a roster spot with Taylor Green and Zelous Wheeler in spring training in 2012.

Tampa Bay Rays 

On June 21, 2012, the Tampa Bay Rays claimed Conrad off waivers. On June 24, Conrad hit a pair of two-run doubles off Philadelphia Phillies pitcher Cliff Lee to secure a sweep in a day-night doubleheader. Conrad was designated for assignment on August 7 when Evan Longoria returned from the disabled list.

Hanshin Tigers 
Conrad signed with the Hanshin Tigers of Nippon Professional Baseball for the 2013 season.

San Diego Padres
On January 4, 2014, Conrad and the Padres agreed to a minor league deal that did not include a spring training invite. Conrad appeared in 13 games with the major league club, batting .100 with 1 HR. The Padres designated Conrad for assignment on August 19, 2014. He was released on August 21.

Later career
Conrad joined the Sugar Land Skeeters for spring training on April 3, 2015. He signed a minor league contract with the New York Mets on April 25, 2015.

Conrad signed with the Sugar Land Skeeters of the Atlantic League of Professional Baseball, an independent baseball league. He was released on June 23, 2016. In December 2016, Conrad signed a minor league contract with the Kansas City Royals.

Coaching career
Conrad began his coaching career as the manager of the Burlington Royals in 2018. He was named as the manager for the Lexington Legends, the Royals' Low-A affiliate at the time, for the 2019 season. The Legends won the 2019 SAL championship, and Conrad remained the manager at Lexington through the 2020 season. Conrad was named manager of the Columbia Fireflies in 2021. Conrad became manager of the Quad Cities River Bandits, the Royals' High-A affiliate, before the 2022 season.

References

External links

MiLB.com profile

1980 births
Living people
Baseball coaches from California
Baseball players from San Diego
Major League Baseball infielders
Nippon Professional Baseball infielders
Oakland Athletics players
Atlanta Braves players
Milwaukee Brewers players
Tampa Bay Rays players
Hanshin Tigers players
San Diego Padres players
Arizona State Sun Devils baseball players
Pittsfield Astros players
Michigan Battle Cats players
Salem Avalanche players
Lexington Legends players
Corpus Christi Hooks players
Round Rock Express players
Sacramento River Cats players
Gwinnett Braves players
Nashville Sounds players
Durham Bulls players
El Paso Chihuahuas players
American expatriate baseball players in Japan
Mesa Solar Sox players
Sugar Land Skeeters players
People from Spring Valley, San Diego County, California
Minor league baseball managers
Alaska Goldpanners of Fairbanks players